Brendan Cummins may refer to:

 Brendan Cummins (Cork hurler) (born 1950), Cork hurler
 Brendan Cummins (Tipperary hurler) (born 1975), Tipperary hurler